Eli James M. Fuller (also spelled Fyller, born 27 August 1972) is an Antigua and Barbuda windsurfer. He competed in the men's Division II event at the 1988 Summer Olympics.

References

External links
 
 

1972 births
Living people
Antigua and Barbuda male sailors (sport)
Antigua and Barbuda windsurfers
Olympic sailors of Antigua and Barbuda
Sailors at the 1988 Summer Olympics – Division II
Sportspeople from London